Robert Bernard Harwood (June 4, 1902 – October 29, 1991) was a justice of the Supreme Court of Alabama from 1962 to 1975.

Harwood did not run for reelection in 1974.

Harwood "earned his undergraduate and law degrees from the University of Alabama. Admitted to the bar in 1926, he began practicing law in Tuscaloosa the following year. He later attended Harvard Law School and was awarded his LL.M. in 1932".

Harwood served in the Alabama Legislature from 1927 to 1931, and as an Assistant United States Attorney from 1933 to 1935. He taught at the University of Alabama School of Law from 1935 to 1942, also serving as an assistant dean after 1937.

In October 1945, Governor Chauncey Sparks named Harwood to a seat on the Court of Appeals vacated by the death of Judge James Rice.

Harwood was elected to the Supreme Court of Alabama as a Democrat in 1962, and twice re-elected, running unopposed in 1968.

Harwood married Mary Lee Leach of Tuscaloosa in 1926, with whom he had two children. His son, R. Bernard Harwood Jr., also served on the state supreme court, having been elected as a Republican.

References

Justices of the Supreme Court of Alabama
1902 births
1991 deaths
University of Alabama alumni
University of Alabama School of Law alumni
Harvard Law School alumni